Stanciu is a surname. Notable people with the surname include:

Anișoara Cușmir-Stanciu (born 1962), Romanian long jumper
Constantin Stanciu (born 1911), Romanian football player
Daniela Stanciu (born 1987), Romanian high jumper
Ion-Aurel Stanciu (born 1955), Romanian general
Nicolae Stanciu (born 1993), Romanian football player
Nicolae Stanciu (born 1973), Romanian football player
Simion Stanciu (1949-2010), Romanian flute player and composer
Traian Stanciu (1935-2019), Romanian chess master
Denis Stanciu (born 2002), European Champion at Toarball and Goalball

Romanian-language surnames